Jeff Ware (born May 19, 1977) is a Canadian former National Hockey League (NHL) defenceman who played for the Toronto Maple Leafs and the Florida Panthers. He was selected by the Toronto Maple Leafs in the first round (15th overall) of the 1995 NHL Entry Draft.

Hockey career
As a youth, Ware played in the 1991 Quebec International Pee-Wee Hockey Tournament with the Toronto Marlboros minor ice hockey team. Ware played major junior hockey for the Oshawa Generals of the Ontario Hockey League, where he captained the team for the 1995–96 season. He won the league championship in 1997. During his junior career, he also won a gold medal with Team Canada at the 1997 World Juniors hockey tournament in Geneva, Switzerland.

The Toronto Maple Leafs drafted Ware in the first round, 15th overall, at the 1995 NHL Entry Draft. He played in 16 games with the Maple Leafs, never scoring a point. On February 15, 1999  Ware was traded to the Florida Panthers for forward David Nemirovsky. On July 1, 2000, Florida declined to offer Ware a qualifying offer, making him an unrestricted free agent. The Panthers exposed him for selection in the 2000 NHL Expansion Draft, but he was not taken by either of the expansion teams. He played 21 total career games in the NHL, tallying one assist. He retired from hockey in 2002 following five knee surgeries.

Career statistics

Regular season and playoffs

International

References

External links
 

1977 births
Living people
Beast of New Haven players
Canadian ice hockey defencemen
Florida Panthers players
Louisville Panthers players
National Hockey League first-round draft picks
Oshawa Generals players
St. John's Maple Leafs players
Ice hockey people from Toronto
Syracuse Crunch players
Toronto Maple Leafs draft picks
Toronto Maple Leafs players